The small-headed grunter (Scortum parviceps) is a species of fish in the family Terapontidae. It is endemic to Australia where it is known only from the upper Burdekin River in Queensland.

References

small-headed grunter
Freshwater fish of Queensland
small-headed grunter
Taxonomy articles created by Polbot